Parichay Sharma is an Indian television actor who became known for the reality series Splitsvilla 6 on MTV India and for roles in television series such as Aabhas in Aur Pyaar Ho Gaya. He also took part in the youth based show Sadda Haq, and appeared in the daily soap opera Balika Vadhu in the role of Pushkar. Later, he played the role of Ranveer Dutt in Khwaabon Ki Zamin Par which appeared on the Zindagi Channel.

Biography
Sharma was born in Delhi. He studied at Guru Gobind Singh Indraprastha University while also working in theatre for two years. He was subsequently employed as a human resources officer but left to pursue his interest in acting.

Filmography

Television

Web series

References

External links
 

Living people
1984 births
21st-century Indian male actors
Indian male television actors